The Ratanaworabhan's fruit bat (Megaerops niphanae) is a species of megabat in the family Pteropodidae. It is found in Bhutan,  India, Thailand, and Vietnam.

References

Megaerops
Bats of South Asia
Bats of Southeast Asia
Bats of India
Mammals described in 1983
Taxonomy articles created by Polbot